We Are Scissor Sisters... And So Are You is the first DVD by the Scissor Sisters, released on November 29, 2004. It contains a full live concert filmed at Brighton Dome in August 2004, featuring backstage footage and extras. It includes the documentary "Return To Oz" (directed by Julien Temple) which tells the story of the Scissor Sisters. There is also a separate 10-minute skit directed by Andy Soup which has the band dressed up as characters from The Wizard of Oz, which also includes "terribly bad acting" as mentioned on their official website.

Track listing

Live from the Brighton Dome
"Intro"
"Take Your Mama"
"Better Luck"
"Tits on the Radio"
"The Skins"
"Magnifique"
"Rock My Spot"
"Laura"
"Mary"
"Comfortably Numb"
"Filthy/Gorgeous"
"Return to Oz"
"It Can't Come Quickly Enough"
"Music is the Victim"

Music videos
Laura (Version 1)
Comfortably Numb
Take Your Mama
Laura (Version 2)
Mary

Other
4Play Film
Jake Shears vs. Lewis Carroll
Music is the Victim (Live at Benicassim)
Return to Oz (Documentary)

External links
 Official Site
 Underground Illusion - The Ultimate Scissor Sisters Database
 Contactmusic.com article on DVD Preview
 Amazon.com Customer Reviews

2004 live albums
2004 video albums
Live video albums
Scissor Sisters albums